Palinorsa is a moth genus of the family Depressariidae.

Species
 Palinorsa acritomorpha Clarke, 1964
 Palinorsa literatella (Busck, 1911)
 Palinorsa raptans (Meyrick, 1920)
 Palinorsa zonaria Clarke, 1964

References

Depressariinae